Dr Natchimuthuk “Nat” Gopalswamy is an Indian American Solar physicist. He is currently a staff scientist at the Heliophysics Division of NASA’s Goddard Space Flight Center.

Background and scientific career 

Gopalswamy completed a BSc and MSc in physics at the University of Madras in 1975 and 1977, respectively. These were followed by a PhD at the Indian Institute of Science in 1982. He took up research positions at the Indian Institute of Astrophysics, Bengaluru, working on radio observations of the Sun at the Kodaikanal Solar Observatory. In 1985 he moved to the University of Maryland, working on solar radio bursts, before moving to NASA Goddard Space Flight Center in 1997, with a joint research professor position at Catholic University of America. He focused on coronal mass ejections (CMEs) and the relation to solar radio bursts.

Research interests 
Gopalswamy's primary research interest is solar eruptive phenomenon and their relation to radio bursts and energetic particles. His scientific publications have attracted more than 20,000 citations. His early work focussed on multi-wavelength observations of CMEs. More recently, his work with the Large-angle and Spectrometric Coronagraph (LASCO) aboard the Solar and Heliospheric Observatory (SOHO) spacecraft is of particular note. He maintains the widely used catalogue of LASCO-observed CMEs. This long-term dataset has allowed the link between the approximately 11-year solar cycle and CMEs to be better understood. During the 2017 solar eclipse, he led a team making spectroscopic measurements of the solar corona.
He is the PI of The Balloon-Borne Investigation of Temperature and Speed of Electrons in the Corona (BITSE). He is also the Co-I of  Solar Terrestrial Relations Observatory 
(STEREO) WAVES, and Sun Earth Connection Coronal and Heliospheric Investigation (SECCHI) white-light coronagraph COR1 instruments.

Outreach Activities 
Gopalswamy has been conducting numerous outreach activities and have initiated programs to benefit researchers all across the globe. He is the Executive director of the International Space Weather Initiative (ISWI) since 2013. He initiated the SCOSTEP Visiting Scholar (SVS) program in 2015 while president of the Scientific Committee on Solar-Terrestrial Physics (SCOSTEP) in 2015.

Professional Societies  

2022 - Present :  Fellow of the International Science Council

1986 - Present : Member of the American Geophysical Union (AGU)

1986 - Present: Member of the American Astronomical Society (AAS), 

2004 - Present: Member, Distinguished Lecturer, Session convener  of the Asia Oceania Geosciences Society (AOGS)

1983 - Present : Life Member of the Astronomical Society of India (ASI)

1985 - Present : Member, Commission chair of the International Astronomical Union (IAU)

2011 - Present : Member of the Japan Geophysical Union (JpGU)

Awards and honours 

Gopalswamy has received several prestigious  awards and honours, some of which are listed below: 

2019 Doctor Honoris Causa, Bulgarian Academy of Sciences

2019 American Geophysical Union Richard Carrington Award

2016 Elected American Geophysical Union Fellow

2011 Scientific Committee on Solar-Terrestrial Physics (SCOSTEP) President

2010 Asia Oceania Geosciences Society (AOGS) Distinguished Lecturer, 2010

2009 Elected president of International Astronomical Union Commission 49 (interplanetary plasma and heliosphere)

2007 Associate editor for Geophysical Research Letters

2006 Editorial board for Sun and Geosphere

2000 Associate editor of Journal of Geophysical Research (Space Physics)

1996 Elected fellow of the Science and Technology Agency of Japan

References 

American physicists
Year of birth missing (living people)
Living people
University of Madras alumni
Indian Institute of Science alumni